Bruce Herbert Warren Howe was the 4th coadjutor bishop of Huron who later became its diocesan.

He was born in 1947, educated at the University of King's College and ordained in Nova Scotia in 1974. After working in the Anglican Diocese of Toronto, he returned to Nova Scotia for several years, after which he returned to Ontario in 1988 as Dean of Huron and Rector of St. Paul's Cathedral. He was elected the 11th Bishop of Huron in 2000. He announced his retirement to take effect on 1 September 2008.

References

 

1947 births
University of King's College alumni
Anglican bishops of Huron
21st-century Anglican Church of Canada bishops
Living people